Ehrman is a surname. Notable persons with the name include:

Bart D. Ehrman (born 1955), American Biblical scholar
John Ehrman (1920–2011), British historian
Lee Ehrman (born 1935), American geneticist 
Marli Ehrman (1904–1982), German-American textile artist
Riccardo Ehrman (1929–2021), Italian journalist 
Sara Ehrman (1919–2017), American political activist
William Ehrman (born 1950), retired British diplomat and intelligence officer

See also
Ehrmann (surname)

German-language surnames